Deron Dixon (born 18 January 1967) is a Jamaican former cricketer. He played in five first-class and four List A matches for the Jamaican cricket team from 1984 to 1989. In 2008, he was appointed as the manager of the team.

See also
 List of Jamaican representative cricketers

References

External links
 

1967 births
Living people
Jamaican cricketers
Jamaica cricketers
Sportspeople from Kingston, Jamaica